Trithemis aconita, the halfshade dropwing,  is a species of dragonfly in the family Libellulidae. It is found in Benin, Botswana, Cameroon, Ivory Coast, Equatorial Guinea, Ethiopia, Ghana, Guinea, Kenya, Liberia, Malawi, Mozambique, Namibia, Nigeria, South Africa, Tanzania, Togo, Uganda, Zambia, Zimbabwe, and possibly Burundi. Its natural habitats are subtropical or tropical moist lowland forests and rivers.

References

External links

  Text for halfshade dropwing from South African Dragonfly Atlas 

aconita
Taxonomy articles created by Polbot
Insects described in 1969